James Tinling (May 8, 1889 in Seattle – May 14, 1967 in Los Angeles) was an American film director. He worked during the silent period as a prop boy and stuntman, and directed primarily for 20th Century Fox in the 1930s and 1940s. He has been cited as one of the best B-film directors for Fox, known for directing numerous westerns and lighthearted films, including Charlie Chan in Shanghai (1935).

Selected filmography

Don't Marry (1928)
Words and Music (1929)
One Mad Kiss (1930)
For the Love o' Lil (1930)
The Flood (1931)
Arizona to Broadway (1933)
The Last Trail (1933)
Jimmy and Sally (1933)
Under the Pampas Moon (1935)  
Charlie Chan in Shanghai (1935)
The Holy Terror (1937)
45 Fathers (1937)
Lone Star Ranger (1942)
Sundown Jim (1942)
The Crime Smasher (1943)
 Rendezvous 24 (1946)
Strange Journey (1946)
Roses Are Red (1947)
Trouble Preferred (1948)
Tales of Robin Hood (May 1951)

References

External links
 

1889 births
1967 deaths
American stunt performers
Film directors from Washington (state)
Filmmakers from Seattle